Pilcomayo (in Hispanicized spelling) (Quechua Pillkumayu or Pillku Mayu, pillku red, mayu river, "red river", Guarani Ysyry Araguay ) is a river in central South America.

Along its course, the Pilcomayo silts up and splits into two main branches, North and South. After some distance, these branches rejoin to form the Lower Pilcomayo.

The Pilcomayo rises in the foothills of the Andes mountain range in the Oruro Department in Bolivia, east of Lake Poopó. The Jach'a Juqhu River is considered the origin of the Pilcomayo. Upstream the Jach'a Juqhu River successively receives the names Aguas Calientes and Kachi Mayu. From the confluence with the Chillawa (Chillahua), the river is called Pilcomayo. From there, it flows in a southeasterly direction through Chuquisaca and Tarija departments, passes through the Argentine province of Formosa and the Gran Chaco plains of Paraguay, forming most of the border between these two countries before it joins the Paraguay River near Asunción. The Río Pilcomayo National Park is located on the Argentine side of the border. It also forms a short part of the boundary between Argentina and Bolivia, just prior to the Argentina–Bolivia–Paraguay tripoint.

Human settlement
The river basin is home to approximately 1.5 million people: one million in Bolivia, 300,000 in Argentina, and 200,000 in Paraguay.

The Nakotoi Indian Tribe resides in the southern region of the Pilcomayo, a region located along the river in central Paraguay. The aborigines of this tribe are descendants of the highly renowned Redskin Tribe. The Natokoi treated all neighbors as enemies, but none more so than the Tobas Tribe and the Nimká Tribe, their respective neighbors to the southwest and northeast. Guerrilla warfare has long existed between the tribes, isolating the tribe from direct intercourse with the European settlers in the late 19th century.  Men of this tribe are generally tall and skinny, built like hunters or warriors, whereas women are short in size. The Natokoi dress in a rug, fastened around the waist-line.

Gallery

See also
 List of rivers of Argentina
 List of rivers of Paraguay
 List of rivers of Bolivia
 Oroncota, Yampara settlement and Inca fortress in the Pilcomayo River valley of Bolivia.
 Gran Chaco

References

Sources
Kerr, Graham. A Naturalist in the Gran Chaco. Cambridge: Cambridge UP, 1950.
Pilcomayo River. (2010). In Encyclopædia Britannica. Retrieved January 18, 2010, from Encyclopædia Britannica Online: http://www.britannica.com/EBchecked/topic/460371/Pilcomayo-River
W. H. Strosnider, F. Llanos, R.W. Nairn: LEGACY OF NEARLY 500 YEARS OF MINING IN POTOSÍ, BOLIVIA: STREAM WATER QUALITY (pdf) - conference paper at the 2008 National Meeting of the American Society of Mining and Reclamation. New Opportunities to Apply Our Science, June 14–19, Richmond, VA.

Rivers of Paraguay
Rivers of Argentina
Rivers of Formosa Province
Argentina–Paraguay border
Argentina–Bolivia border
International rivers of South America
Rivers of Chuquisaca Department
Rivers of Oruro Department
Rivers of Potosí Department
Rivers of Tarija Department
Rivers of Salta Province
Tributaries of the Paraguay River
Border rivers
Ramsar sites in Argentina